Alakbarzadeh is a surname. Notable people with the surname include:

Abulhasan Alakbarzadeh (1906–1986), Soviet Azerbaijani writer
Sevda Alakbarzadeh (born 1977), Azerbaijani singer